Adugu Jaadalu is a 1966 Indian Telugu-language philosophical film, produced by the M. Sambasiva Rao, G. Vandanamon under  Nava Jyothi Films banner It stars N. T. Rama Rao, Jamuna, S. V. Ranga Rao with music composed by Master Venu.

Plot
Dr. Krishna (S. V. Ranga Rao) is a noble person who is enriched with human values & norms and dedicated his life to his hospital. Krishna is making research on inventing an anti-polio medicine. Dr. Vijay (N. T. Rama Rao) the grandson of Zamindar Padmasri Sivaramakrishna Prasad (Relangi) is a medical graduate, he still enjoys the life in the frolic. Vijay & Parvati (Jamuna), only daughter of Dr. Krishna always get into petty quarrels. Once, Dr. Krishna visits a seaside resort for rest when he gets a severe breathing attack. At the same time, Vijay also meets with an accident and the oxygen cylinder which was brought for Dr. Krishna is utilized for Vijay. By which, Dr. Krishna dies and his hospital & patients become an orphan. After coming to consciousness, everybody starts blaming Vijay and Parvati sees him as a demon. Desperate Vijay feels that he is responsible for Dr. Krishna's death. On the advice of a nurse Sarada (Surabhi Balasaraswathi), Vijay decides to replace Dr. Krishna position by walking in his footsteps and joins as a doctor in his hospital. In the beginning, no one likes him but he endures all the insults and makes himself recognized as a good doctor. But he feels something else is lacking behind to follow the ideologies of Dr.Krishna. Then Sarada informs him regarding a diary of Dr.Krishna. Vijay requests Parvati to give it, but she refuses and hands it over to the hospital. As it is in code language, nobody can understand and throws it into the dustbin. Vijay acquires it after a great deal of dedication he decodes it. Now he wants to reveal it to Parvati, but she is not ready to listen, tries to run away and meets with an accident when she loses her eyesight. At present, the blames on Vijay increases but takes up with cheer and start serving Parvati by introducing himself as Shekar. Meanwhile, Vijay successfully completes Dr. Krishna's research which Parvati does not accept, she accompanies with remaining doctors, makes a complaint to the medical board that Vijay has stolen Dr. Krishna's diary and completed the research. The inquiry is held, everybody accuses him as a criminal and he is terminated from the medical services. After that judgment, Vijay wants to speak a while, he shows all the people whom Dr. Krishna helped in his entire life without giving his identity and also reads the diary which was nothing but adage of human values which tells how much happiness an individual gets while performing work without selfishness. Here everyone understands Vijay's virtue including Parvati, she also learns that Vijay is only Shekar and says sorry to him. At last, Parvati gets back her eyesight and the movie ends on a happy note with the marriage of Vijay & Parvati.

Cast
N. T. Rama Rao as Dr. Vijay
Jamuna as Parvathi
S. V. Ranga Rao as Dr. Krishna
Relangi as Padmasri Sivaramakrishna Prasad
V. Nagayya as Doctor 
Mukkamala as Singanna 
Mikkilineni as Doctor 
Chalam as Shyam 
Surabhi Balasaraswathi as Sarada 
Rama Prabha as Kokila
Kakarala as Dr. Ram

Soundtrack

Music composed by Master Venu.

References

External links

Indian drama films
1960s Telugu-language films
Films directed by Tapi Chanakya
1966 drama films
1966 films
Films scored by Master Venu